Elvira Kamaloğlu is a Ukrainian-born Turkish freestyle wrestler competing in the 57 kg division. She is a member of Erzincan G.S.K.

Career 
In 2021, Elvira Kamaloğlu won a bronze medal in the women's 57 kg event at the 2021 World Junior Wrestling Championships in Russia.

Elvira Kamaloğlu won the gold medal in the women's 57kg at the European Under-23 Wrestling Championships in Bulgaria. Elvira beat Spain's Maria Victoria Baez Dilone, Poland's Patrycja Gil, Bulgaria's Sezen Behcetova Belberova, and finally, Hungary's Tamara Dollak to win gold the women's 57kg at the European Under-23 Wrestling Championships in Plovdiv.

She lost her bronze medal match in the 57 kg event at the 2022 European Wrestling Championships held in Budapest, Hungary. A few months later, she won the silver medal in her event at the Matteo Pellicone Ranking Series 2022 held in Rome, Italy. She also won the silver medal in her event at the 2022 Tunis Ranking Series event held in Tunis, Tunisia. She competed in the 55 kg event at the 2022 World Wrestling Championships held in Belgrade, Serbia. She won one of the bronze medals in the 55kg event at the 2022 U23 World Wrestling Championships held in Pontevedra, Spain.

Personal life
Kamaloğlu is of Turkish Meskhetian origin.

References

External links 
 

Living people
Turkish female sport wrestlers
Meskhetian Turkish people
2001 births
Islamic Solidarity Games medalists in wrestling
Islamic Solidarity Games competitors for Turkey
21st-century Turkish women